Elachistocleis pearsei (common name: Colombian plump frog) is a species of frog in the family Microhylidae. It is found in the Pacific versant of western Panama, Caribbean lowlands of Colombia and into the Magdalena River Valley, and in northwest Venezuela. The specific name pearsei honors Arthur Sperry Pearse, an American zoologist.

Elachistocleis pearsei was until recently considered to form monotypic genus Relictivomer, but in molecular phylogeny Elachistocleis pearsei is nested within other Elachistocleis, leading to resurrection of name Elachistocleis pearsei.

Its range extends from lowland dry forests to premontane rain/wet forests. Breeding takes place in temporary and permanent pools after the rains. It probably is locally impacted by habitat loss.

References

pearsei
Amphibians of Colombia
Amphibians of Panama
Amphibians of Venezuela
Amphibians described in 1914
Taxa named by Alexander Grant Ruthven
Taxonomy articles created by Polbot